Marcel Rath (born 3 September 1975) is a German former professional footballer who played as a striker.

References

External links
 

1975 births
Living people
Association football forwards
German footballers
Germany youth international footballers
Germany under-21 international footballers
Bundesliga players
2. Bundesliga players
Cypriot First Division players
Eisenhüttenstädter FC Stahl players
Hertha BSC players
FC Energie Cottbus players
FC St. Pauli players
Rot Weiss Ahlen players
1. FC Union Berlin players
SV Waldhof Mannheim players
Digenis Akritas Morphou FC players
German expatriate footballers
German expatriate sportspeople in Cyprus
Expatriate footballers in Cyprus
Sportspeople from Frankfurt (Oder)
Footballers from Brandenburg